Felletin is a commune in the Creuse department in the Nouvelle-Aquitaine region in central France.

Historically, the term Aubusson tapestry often covers the similar products made in the nearby town of Felletin, 8 kilometres away, whose products are often treated as "Aubusson".  The industry had probably developed since soon after 1300 in looms in family workshops, perhaps already run by the Flemings that are noted in documents from the 16th century.

Geography
The commune is served by a TER railway and is within the national park of the Millevaches (not 1000 cows, but lakes).

Population

Sights
 The twelfth-century church.
 Three chapels from the fifteenth century.
 The church of Notre-Dame, from the fifteenth century.
 Two dolmens.
 A thirteenth-century castle and later ramparts
 The present and previous mairies, both dating from the eighteenth century.
 Several ancient houses.
 A medieval bridge over the Creuse.
 A thirteenth-century octagonal monument in the cemetery.

Personalities
 Fernand de Brinon, French wartime Nazi collaborator, b. 26th Aug 1885, executed 15 April 1947, was buried at Felletin.

International relations
Felletin is twinned with:
 Schladming, Austria, since 1960.

See also
Communes of the Creuse department

References

Communes of Creuse
County of La Marche